Xoxocotlán International Airport   (in Mexican Spanish) is an international airport located in Oaxaca City, Oaxaca, Mexico. The airport has one terminal with ten gates that handles all domestic and international air traffic.
An airport lounge operated by Global Lounge Network is located at the terminal.

Information 
In 2021, the airport handled 913,937 passengers, and in 2022 it handled 1,304,034 passengers according to Grupo Aeroportuario del Sureste.

The airport has the exclusive VIP lounge, The Lounge by GLN.

Airlines and destinations

Passenger

Cargo

Statistics

Passengers

Busiest routes

Name 
The name of the airport is due to its location within the municipality of Santa Cruz Xoxocotlán, a Southern suburb of Oaxaca City.

See also 

List of the busiest airports in Mexico

References

External links
 

Airports in Oaxaca
Oaxaca City